Bagdasarian, Bagdasaryan, Baghdasarian or Baghdasaryan is an Armenian surname with the meaning "son of Baghdasar" (Armenian for Balthazar) that may refer to:

Bagdasarian / Bagdasaryan
Aleksandr Sergeevich Bagdasaryan (born 1946), Soviet Armenian radio and electronics engineer. 10002 Bagdasarian is a minor planet named after him 
Arsen Bagdasaryan (1977), Turkmen-Armenian footballer
Prince Bagdasarian, American film director, screenwriter, and editor
Ross Bagdasarian (1919–1972), creator of Alvin and the Chipmunks
Ross Bagdasarian Jr. (born 1949), his son, who continues the Chipmunk franchise effort

Baghdasarian / Baghdasaryan
Artur Baghdasaryan (1968), Armenian politician
Getik Baghdasarian (1949), Armenian sculptor
Sargis Baghdasaryan (1923-2001), Soviet Armenian sculptor

Other
10002 Bagdasarian, see item 10002 on the List of minor planets: 10001–11000
Bagdasarian Productions, Armenian-American production company

See also 
 Baghdasar

Armenian-language surnames
Patronymic surnames
Surnames from given names